The Rockdale, Sandow and Southern Railroad  was a Class III railroad operating in the United States state of Texas.

In 2005, the holding company RailAmerica purchased the railroad. It ultimately became part of Genesee & Wyoming's holdings.

The railroad's traffic came mainly from aluminum products, as well as other metals.  RSS hauled around 6,100 carloads in 2008.

In December 2018, Alcoa Energy Services, which owned a closed smelter on the line, announced that it planned to acquire the railroad, which by that time was inactive, and a year later filed to abandon the line on the grounds that it had no realistic chance of obtaining customers.

References 

Texas railroads
RailAmerica